Rathdrumgran is a townland of 185 acres in County Armagh, Northern Ireland. It is situated in the civil parish of Loughgall and the historic barony of Oneilland West.

See also
 List of townlands in County Armagh

References

Townlands of County Armagh
Civil parish of Loughgall